Lake Nasser is a vast reservoir in southern Egypt and northern Sudan. It is one of the largest man-made lakes in the world. Before construction, Sudan was against the building of Lake Nasser, because it would encroach on land in the northern part of the country, where many Nubian people lived who would have to be resettled. In the end Sudan's land near the area of Lake Nasser was mostly flooded by the lake.

Strictly speaking, "Lake Nasser" refers only to the much larger portion of the lake that is in Egyptian territory (83% of the total), with the Sudanese preferring to call their smaller body of water Lake Nubia. 


Description

The lake was created as a result of the construction of the Aswan High Dam across the waters of the Nile between 1958 and 1970. The lake is named after Gamal Abdel Nasser, one of the leaders of the Egyptian Revolution of 1952, and the second President of Egypt, who initiated the High Dam project. It was President Anwar Sadat who inaugurated the lake and dam in 1971.

Current issues
Egypt lacks the water it needs for agriculture and electricity. The Grand Ethiopian Renaissance Dam, currently being constructed in Ethiopia, has caused tensions between Egypt and Sudan and Ethiopia. Egypt is worried that the new dam will stop the Nile River from adequately filling Lake Nasser. The water supply of Lake Nasser produces electricity, and there is concern that diminishing water flowing into Lake Nasser will adversely affect the Aswan Dam's ability to generate electricity. There are pumping stations that control the water going into Lake Nasser, and currently this project generates 10 billion kilowatt-hours of hydroelectric power each year to Egyptians.

Sport and tourism 

Fishing for Nile perch, from both on the shore and from boats, is popular. 

Before Lake Nasser was filled, as part of the International Campaign to Save the Monuments of Nubia, many ancient Egyptian sites were physically relocated to new locations above the lake's high water level. However, some were not relocated, such as part of the massive fortress of Buhen, which is now underwater. The relocation of the temples at Abu Simbel, one of the most recognizable ancient sites in Egypt, was the most publicized.

Lake Nasser boat cruises, which include visiting the monuments and temples along the edge of Lake Nasser, are very popular. Visiting the temples at Abu Simbel is a highlight of these tours.

Gallery

Further reading
Helen Chapin Metz, ed., Egypt: A Country Study. Washington: GPO for the Library of Congress, 1990.

See also

Aniba (Nubia), a region flooded by Lake Nasser

References

External links

Lake Nasser at Encyclopædia Britannica
360 Degree Panorama of Lake Nasser 
Abu Simbel: The Temples That Moved

 
Aswan
Aswan Governorate
Nasser
Nasser
Nile
Nasser, Lake
Nubia, Lake
Egypt–Sudan border crossings
Nasser
River regulation in Egypt
Tourist attractions in Egypt